Jean Natal Ratsimialona (born May 23, 1978) is a Malagasy footballer currently plays for AS Adema.

External links
 

1978 births
Living people
Malagasy footballers
Madagascar international footballers
AS Fortior players
AS Adema players
Association football midfielders